The Scabs are a Belgian (punk) rock group. They are best known for their hit singles "Matchbox Car" (1983) and "Hard Times" (1991), which have become classics on Belgian radio.

History
The band was founded in Diest in 1979. The original core members were Guy Swinnen (vocals/guitar), Berre Bergen (bass), Francis Vangeel (guitar) and Frankie Saenen (drums). In 1983 Vangeel was replaced by Mark Lakke Vanbinst who left two years later to join the band La Fille d'Ernest. His replacement was Willy Willy, a former member of Vaya Con Dios. In 1989, Fons Sijmons replaced Berre Bergen, who joined De Kreuners.

The Scabs achieved their greatest success with their third album Royalty in Exile (1990) earning a gold disc, and the album Jumping the Tracks (1991). In 1994 Willy Willy left the group and replaced by Tjenne Berghmans. In 1996 the group was disbanded. They started touring again in 2007.

Three of the members are dead; Sijmons died on 18 July 2013 from lung cancer and Korsakov's syndrome, Bergen died of emphysema on 7 February 2016, and Willy died from cancer at the age of 59 on 13 February 2019.

Albums
For all the wolf calls (1984)
Skintight (1988)
Gangbang + Rockery (1989)
Royalty in Exile (1990)
Jumping the Tracks (1991)

References

Belgian rock music groups
Belgian punk rock groups
Musical groups established in 1979
Musical groups disestablished in 1996